Tales of Erotica (also known as Erotic Tales) is a 1996 compilation of four erotic short films directed by Ken Russell, Susan Seidelman, Melvin Van Peebles and Bob Rafelson

Shorts featured

External links

1996 films
German anthology films
Compilation films
1996 drama films
1996 short films
1990s erotic films
1990s erotic drama films
Films directed by Bob Rafelson
Films directed by Melvin Van Peebles
Films directed by Susan Seidelman
Films directed by Ken Russell
Trimark Pictures films
1990s English-language films
German erotic drama films
American anthology films
American erotic drama films
1990s American films
1990s German films